Stack is a sports performance and athlete lifestyle publication targeted at high school student athletes. Double issues of STACK Magazine are distributed free of cost three times per year to 13,500 high schools nationwide (about 75% of all U.S. high schools with sports programs), resulting in a readership of 5.4 million athletes.

Content
The magazine covers a wide variety of  topics, including training, nutrition, sports skills, athlete lifestyle and motivation. The articles are often sport-specific in nature, covering nearly all sports including football, basketball, baseball, track, soccer, volleyball, swimming, wrestling, softball, lacrosse, tennis, and hockey.

History
STACK Media, Inc. was founded by Nick Palazzo and Chad Zimmerman, both former collegiate athletes, in Cleveland, Ohio in February 2005. STACK Magazine's premier issue featuring a young LeBron James on the cover was printed and distributed shortly thereafter. STACK was originally financed privately, helped by a $15,000 win from a 2003 competition organized by Northeast Ohio's Council of Smaller Enterprises. Further financing has come from its current Chairman and from private equity firm CapitalWorks LLC of Cleveland. The extensive readership, mostly males in the age range 12–24, has attracted major Blue Chip advertisers including Nike, Inc., Reebok, Gatorade, ASICS, New Balance, Under Armour, Milk, Navy and the United States Army.

References 

2005 establishments in Ohio
Bimonthly magazines published in the United States
Sports magazines published in the United States
Magazines established in 2005
Magazines published in Cleveland